Philip Sisson Gregory (born 1954) is a retired British rower who competed for Great Britain.

Rowing career
Gregory was part of the eight that reached the final and finished 5th, at the 1977 World Rowing Championships in Amsterdam.

Personal life
By trade he is the Managing Director of Janousek Racing Boats and Stämpfli Racing Boats.

References

1954 births
Living people
British male rowers